Men's Health Network (MHN) is a non-profit international educational organization of health care professionals and interested individuals that focuses on improving male health and wellness. MHN has since been classified as a tax-exempt entity under Section 501(c)(3) of the U.S. Internal Revenue Service code.

MHN is based in the United States and is incorporated in the District of Columbia.

Networks
In 1994, MHN provided the impetus for Men's Health Week in the week leading up to and including Father's Day and Men's Health Month (June), typical events include educational lectures by sports figures, free health screenings, and health fairs. The organization also offers health information online through digital libraries, directories, free screening calendars, and websites such as www.checkmensfacts.com and as over the phone through Men’s Healthline.

Key Staff 

 Ana Fadich - Vice President

 Judy Seals-Togbo - Manager, Faith-based Initiatives and Minority Health Programs

 Mike Leventhal - Executive Director

 Ramon Llamas - External Relations and Strategic Partnerships, and Minority Health Initiatives

External links
 Official Website
 Key Staff

See also
 Men's health

Medical and health organizations based in Washington, D.C.
Andrology
Men's health organizations